Elysium is the eleventh studio album by English synth-pop duo Pet Shop Boys. Released on 5 September 2012, it is the duo's final album with Parlophone. The album was recorded in 2012 in Los Angeles and produced by Andrew Dawson and Pet Shop Boys.

Background and release

Pet Shop Boys began writing the songs for the album in Berlin over a period of five weeks in early 2011. Most of the album was written during the Progress Live concert tour with Take That from May to July 2011. In January 2012, Pet Shop Boys travelled to Los Angeles to work with American producer Andrew Dawson for three months. The duo were interested in working with Dawson after seeing his name in the credits for the Kanye West albums 808s & Heartbreak (2008) and My Beautiful Dark Twisted Fantasy (2010). Chris Lowe has described Elysium as having the same feel as Behaviour (1990), but "sonically I think it's very different." The duo considered Happy Sad as title of the album, but came up with the title Elysium during a walk in Elysian Park in Los Angeles. Lyrically, the album can be interpreted as "about being us at our stage in our life, doing what we do", according to Neil Tennant.

Elysium was released in Japan on 5 September 2012, followed by Germany and most of Europe, Australia and New Zealand on 7 September; the United Kingdom, France, South America saw the release on 10 September, and the United States and Canada received it on 11 September. There are two CD formats: a single CD and a special double-CD edition which includes instrumentals of each song. A double-vinyl album was released in limited quantities which also includes the instrumental versions.

Artwork
The artwork was designed by Mark Farrow.

Release and promotion
A teaser video was released in June 2012 for the track "Invisible". The short film was made by Brian Bress and the song features backing vocals by singer-songwriter James Fauntleroy II and veteran singers Oren, Maxine and Julie Waters. The album's first official single, "Winner", was released digitally on 3 July 2012, and subsequently in August 2012 as a four-track CD and digital EP. The "Winner" EP includes the non-album tracks "A Certain 'Je Ne Sais Quoi'", "The Way Through the Woods" and a cover version of Bee Gees' "I Started a Joke". A second digital EP of "Winner" containing remixes by Andrew Dawson, John Dahlbäck and Niki & The Dove was released a week later.

The second single, "Leaving", was released on 12 October 2012, containing the non-album tracks "Hell" and "In His Imagination", a 2003 demo titled "Baby", a remix by Dusty Kid, two remixes by Andrew Dawson, and three remixes by the duo themselves.

"Memory of the Future" was released as the album's third and final single on 31 December 2012. A seven-inch mix was commissioned by Stuart Price, as well as remixes from Price, Ulrich Schnauss, DJ Waldo Squash and Digital Dog. It also contains three non-album tracks: "Listening", "One Night" and "Inside".

Elysium was re-released on 20 October 2017 (along with 2009's Yes) as Elysium/Further Listening 2011–2012. In addition to the remastered album with its original track listing, the reissue also included a second disc of B-sides, demos and remixes from the era.

Critical reception

Elysium received generally positive reviews from music critics. At Metacritic, which assigns a normalised rating out of 100 to reviews from mainstream publications, the album received an average score of 67, based on 20 reviews. Simon Price of The Independent on Sunday wrote, "If Elysium has a weakness, it is the absolute absence of thumping disco-pop monsters. Once you accept that, and surrender to the tranquil beauty of Chris Lowe's synth textures, you quickly realise that Neil Tennant is on top lyrical form". Robert Christgau of MSN Music quipped that although the album "may well seem too restrained", the duo are "at peace with the fate of their fame and their retirement accounts. And the understated beats suit their elysian equanimity." Kevin Ritchie of Now described the album as one of the duo's "most serene and sonically consistent efforts to date", adding that the song "Hold On" "exemplifies why Elysium is one of the year's most beautiful pop albums." Drowned in Sounds Jon Clark viewed the album as "a cohesive and strong effort that can stand up with some of [the duo's] best", calling it "a wise and knowing homage to the life of a pop star". BBC Music's Nick Levine commented that although Elysium "isn't quite a top-drawer Pets album like 1988's Introspective or 1993's Very", it "could be Pet Shop Boys' warmest, wisest album yet." Owen Myers of NME characterised the album as "a massive foamy middle-finger to retromania, running elegantly from jangly indie to kraut jabs". David Jeffries of AllMusic referred to Elysium as "an interesting, sour, and insider-aimed dispatch from backstage, interrupted by some big moments that sound entirely commissioned."

The Guardian critic Jude Rogers opined that half of the album "harks back to 1990's reflective masterpiece, Behaviour, with songs about ageing [...] and escape [...] exerting poignant pulls", but the other half "feels bitter and flippant", concluding that producer Dawson "provides a light LA gloss, but not the heavenly direction the duo deserve." In a review for The Observer, Phil Mongredien cited "Your Early Stuff" and "Ego Music" as highlights, while noting that "elsewhere [the duo are] on autopilot too often for this to be anything more than just another solid Pet Shop Boys album." Despite dubbing album opener "Leaving" "excellent", musicOMH's Laurence Green felt that "the rest of the album never materialises in the way you'd quite hope it would." Green continued, "[I]f Elysium is tainted by a slight tang of disappointment, it is a disappointment tempered in part by its recalling of Behaviour." Under the Radars Dan Lucas complimented keyboardist Lowe's work on the album, stating, "There may be no stand-out musical line that will live long in the memory, but even more naïve melodies such as 'Winner' constantly shift and change, never growing dull." However, he criticised singer Tennant, claiming his "vocal lines often struggle to fit the songs". Douglas Wolk of Pitchfork wrote that "Tennant's mature gift as a lyricist is for sentimentality tempered by slyness, and he pulls that off a few times", but found that "[t]oo much of Elysium [...] misplaces its subtlety." Andy Gill of The Independent expressed that Elysium is "bookended by two of the best songs the Pet Shop Boys have written in years ['Leaving' and 'Requiem in Denim and Leopardskin'], but flags badly in between", naming "Hold On" the worst song on the album.

Commercial performance
Elysium debuted at number nine on the UK Albums Chart, selling 10,418 copies in its first week. In the United States, Elysium debuted at number 44 on the Billboard 200 with first-week sales of 7,000 copies. It also debuted at number two on Billboards Dance/Electronic Albums chart.

Track listing

Personnel
Credits adapted from the liner notes of Elysium.

Musicians

 James Fauntleroy II – additional vocals 
 Oren Waters – additional vocals 
 Maxine Waters – additional vocals 
 Julia Waters – additional vocals 
 Lenny Castro – percussion 
 Joachim Horsley – orchestra arrangement, conducting 
 Andrew Dawson – orchestra arrangement ; additional programming ; guitar ; drums ; keyboards 
 Ben Leathers – orchestra arrangement 
 Mark Robertson – contractor 
 Ryan Hoyle – drums 
 Adam Tressler – guitar 
 Sonos – additional vocals 
 Carmen Carter – additional vocals 
 Alex Brown – additional vocals 
 Luther Waters – additional vocals 
 Vivi Rama – bass 
 Pet Shop Boys – original orchestra arrangement 
 Pete Gleadall – additional programming

Orchestra

 Mark Robertson – violin
 Endre Granat – violin
 Ana Landauer – violin
 Peter Kent – violin
 Clayton Haslop – violin
 Sam Fischer – violin
 Neli Nikolaeva – violin
 Serena McKinney – violin
 Andrew Duckles – viola
 David Walther – viola
 Matt Funes – viola
 Jessica van Velzen Freer – viola
 David Low – cello
 Tim Landauer – cello
 Dennis Karmazyn – cello
 Victor Lawrence – cello
 Vanessa Freebairn-Smith – cello
 Jim Thatcher – French horn
 Lisa McCormick – French horn
 Rick Baptist – trumpet
 Rob Schaer – trumpet

Technical

 Andrew Dawson – production, engineering, mixing
 Pet Shop Boys – production
 Jorge Velasco – mix assistance
 Chris Athens – mastering
 Mike Riley – additional vocals recording ; engineering 
 Robert Fernandez – orchestra engineering, orchestra mixing 
 Charlie Paakkari – string engineering assistance 
 Max Plisskin – additional vocals recording assistance 
 Ryan Hoyle – drum recording 
 Jim Caruana – engineering 
 Anna Ugarte – engineering assistance 
 Pete Gleadall – lead vocals recording ; additional engineering

Artwork
 Farrow – design, art direction
 PSB – design, art direction
 Ann Summa – PSB photograph

Charts

Release history

Notes

References

2012 albums
Astralwerks albums
Parlophone albums
Pet Shop Boys albums

Albums recorded at Capitol Studios